Boustead Heavy Industries Corporation Berhad, known for its subsidiary Boustead Naval Shipyard and often abbreviated as BHIC and BNS is a Malaysian industrial group specialised in naval and commercial shipbuilding as well as ship-related services. Its primary focus is shipbuilding, fabrication of offshore structures, as well as repair and maintenance of vessels and aircraft. The company is a public limited company and the largest shareholder is Lembaga Tabung Angkatan Tentera, a government statutory body which provides retirement benefits and a savings scheme for officers of the Malaysian Armed Forces, with a 58.69% stake. The second largest shareholder is Kumpulan Wang Persaraan, a company created by the Malaysian Government as an investment company, with a stake of 7.17%. The parent company is Boustead Holdings.

History 
Boustead Heavy Industries was created in 2005 after a government enforced merger between Boustead Holdings Berhad's commercial shipbuilding shipyards and the troubled PSC-Naval Dockyard. Since then it has acquired and formed many companies and expanded into many fields of business.

Take over of PSC-Naval Dockyard

Background 

Penang Shipbuilding and Construction - Naval Dockyard Sdn Bhd (PSC-ND), was a division of the Penang Shipbuilding and Construction Industries Bhd (PCSI), a Malaysian Government-Linked Company (GLC), based in Lumut, Perak, Malaysia. The company's primary role was to maintain the Royal Malaysian Navy (RMN) fleet and the Lumut Naval Dockyard.

PSC - Naval Dockyard was born out of the Royal Malaysian Navy's dockyard facilities which was built to provide ship repairs and maintenance services. Under the corporatisation program advocated by the Malaysian Government, the dockyard was corporatised as Limbungan TLDM, a wholly owned government company. It had modern facilities to meet the total maintenance requirements of the Royal Malaysian Navy fleet, from hull repairs to major overhauls and from radar refitting to weapon systems refurbishment.

The company was taken over by the public listed Penang Shipbuilding Corporation Berhad, a company in the stable of the now bankrupt Amin Shah Omar Shah, and renamed PSC - Naval Dockyard Sdn Bhd to reflect the corporate relationship with Penang Shipbuilding Corporation.

In 2005, Public Accounts Committee (PAC) unveiled serious corruption in the PSC-ND and caused solemn concern from the public. Under pressure of the public, Malaysian government enforced a reorganization resulting in the forming of Boustead Heavy Industries.

New Generation Patrol Vessels contract 

PSC - Naval Dockyard Sdn Bhd was made the major contractor for the building and delivery of the New Generation Patrol Vessels (NGPV) programme for the Royal Malaysian Navy.  An international tender for bids was announced, with Germany, the United States, Australia and United Kingdom amongst others submitting their bids. PSC-ND was set to joint venture with the winner to complete the program.

The German Naval Group (GNG) with their proposed model, based on the Blohm + Voss MEKO 100 design, won the bid. A contract was signed on 13 October 1998 for an initial six units, with the GNG as the major sub-contractor. A member of the GNG, the Hamburg-based Blohm + Voss was to build the first two ships, while PSC-ND was to complete the final fitting out and trials. The remaining ships were to be built at the PSC-Naval Dockyard from ship modules supplied by the GNG, with a gradual increase of local content.

The contract also involved technology transfer to PSC-ND from GNG as well as a specified a local content of not less than 30 percent, and an offset programme of not less than 30% of the contract value. The German Naval Group was also to make a counter purchase obligation amounting to 11% of the contract value.
The class of ship is now been classified as the Kedah Class Offshore Patrol Vessel. As of 2010, all 6 ships have been commissioned into the Royal Malaysian Navy.

Financial and delivery problems

In 2005, the Public Accounts Committee (PAC) brought up the public attention after they unveiled serious corruption in the PSC-ND management and also the failure to meet the delivery date of the first NGPV vessel. Local media revealed that the construction of the remaining vessels was also delayed due to financial difficulties in the PSC-Naval Dockyard. Reports of nonpayment to some 40 sub contractors who were owed RM180 million was met by shock from the public. PSC-ND also failed to pay some RM4 million in contributions to the Employees Provident Fund (EPF), the Inland Revenue Board and the National Co-operative Organisation despite having made salary deductions from its 1,500 staff.  PSC-ND has also reportedly sought another grant of RM1.8 billion from the government to complete the vessels.

The PAC claimed that RM120 million would be needed to salvage the first two vessels, and that the Government also needed to pump in at least RM80 million to pay off unpaid local vendors, suppliers and contractors.  This led the NGPV program into a crisis.

The Malaysian government then put in a new management team and the project was revived. Boustead Holdings Bhd, also a Government linked company, took up 37% of stake and became the single largest shareholder of Penang Shipbuilding and Construction Industries (PSCI). As a division of PSCI, PSC-ND was renamed Boustead Naval Shipyard Sdn Bhd and merged with Boustead's commercial shipbuilding companies to become Boustead Heavy Industries.

The first two vessels were eventually delivered and accepted by the Royal Malaysian Navy in 2006, after a delay of some 18 months.

Forming of BYO Marine 

In 2009, Boustead Heavy Industries Corporation Bhd reached an agreement with Yonca-Onuk JV of Turkey, a well known interceptor craft manufacturer to set up a joint venture. Through this joint venture, BYO Marine was formed, named using the names of both companies involved. BYO Marine designs, builds, commissions and supplies high speed advanced composite boats to South East Asia and is supported by a team from Yonca-Onuk JV. BYO Marine supplies interceptor craft to the Malaysia Maritime Enforcement Agency and offers missile equipped fast attack craft designed by Yonca-Onuk JV.

Acquisition of Contraves Advanced Devices 

In July 2010, Rheinmetall Defence of Düsseldorf, Germany, and Boustead Heavy Industries Corporation Bhd of Kuala Lumpur, Malaysia, entered a strategic agreement for the joint ownership of Contraves Advanced Devices Sdn Bhd located in Malacca. Under the joint agreement, Boustead Heavy Industries Corporation took up a 51% stake in the Rheinmetall subsidiary Contraves Advanced Devices effective 1 July 2010. Rheinmetall retained a 49% share in Contraves Advanced Devices and control of the operational management. Rheinmetall Defence and Boustead intended a further collaboration to serve new markets as well as enabling a technology transfer that would substantially benefit both Malaysian industry and the Malaysian Armed Forces. The partnership sought to foster the growth of high-tech production in Malaysia to strengthen the country's defence technology industrial base and open additional opportunities for exports.

Forming of Pyrotechnical Ordnance Malaysia 

In May 2011, Boustead Heavy Industries expanded into the munitions industry when it signed a joint-venture deal with Prokhas Managers Sdn Bhd (PMSB), a Ministry of Finance (Malaysia) company to supply artillery propellants to the Malaysian Armed Forces. Under the joint venture, the new company, Pyrotechnical Ordnance Malaysia Sdn Bhd, would produce double base artillery propellants at a plant located on a 21-acre site in Bentong, Pahang. BHIC has invested RM58 million into the plant and the plant was expected to produce munitions by Q3 2012. BHIC owns a 49% stake in the company.

Acquisition of MHS Aviation 

In June 2011, Boustead Heavy Industries expanded into the aviation industry by completing the acquisition of a 51% stake in MHS Aviation, Malaysia's largest helicopter service company, with 70% of the market value. The acquisition cost Boustead Heavy Industries RM100 million. MHS Aviation's principal activity is the provision of helicopter services to oil and gas companies such as Sarawak Shell Berhad, Esso Production Malaysia Inc. and Petronas Carigali Sdn Bhd. It is also the leading civilian supplier of aircraft charter, search & rescue, emergency medical services and providing training, engineering and technical services.

Facilities and capabilities

Shipbuilding 

The primary source of revenue for Boustead Heavy Industries is shipbuilding. Boustead Heavy Industries has three shipyards located in Malaysia, one of which is specialised in naval vessels while the other two are specialised in commercial vessels.

Boustead Naval Shipyard, specialising in naval vessels, is located near the Royal Malaysian Navy's headquarters at Lumut, Perak. The shipyard is 135 acres, significantly bigger than the other two shipyards. It has built 4 Kedah-class offshore patrol vessels in the past and is currently engaged in the building of 6 more Second Generation Patrol Vessels. The shipyard is being upgraded with the advice of DCNS to prepare for the SGPV project. The work includes new ship lifts, 2 new block assembly halls, 3 new halls for panel assembly and 3 keel lines so that around 2020 the shipyard will be able to assemble 3 SGPV hulls at the same time.

Boustead Penang Shipyard is located on Penang Island, Penang and is involved in the building of commercial vessels. The yard is 20.21 acres and the height is restricted to a certain height due to the Penang Second Bridge that was opened in 2014.

Boustead Langkawi Shipyard is located on Langkawi, Kedah and specialises in building luxury yachts due to Langkawi's location as a tourist and entertainment hotspot.

Ship repair 
Boustead Heavy Industries also offers ship repair in its shipyards and each shipyard serves a different market.

Boustead Naval Shipyard in Lumut specialises in the repair of naval vessels.

Boustead Penang Shipyard offers ship repair services to commercial vessels.

Boustead Langkawi Shipyard specialises in the repair of luxury vessels.

Boustead also owned a submarine repair facility in Sepanggar Naval Base of the Royal Malaysian Navy.

Heavy engineering/Prefabrication 
Another primary source of revenue for Boustead Heavy Industries is heavy engineering/prefabrication.

Boustead Naval Shipyard fabricates container cranes and heavy steel structures for the oil and gas industry.

Boustead Penang Shipyard is the most active shipyard for heavy engineering/prefabrication, offering fabrication for heavy steel structures and platforms as well as oil and gas fabrication like oil platforms.

Boustead Langkawi Shipyard does not have prefabrication facilities.

Aerospace 
Boustead Heavy Industries also engaged in aerospace sector mainly in maintenance, repair and overhaul (MRO) and airline service. Through BHIC AeroServices, the company responsible for the maintenance and supply of spare parts for the Royal Malaysian Air Force (RMAF) Eurocopter EC725 helicopter fleet. In addition, the company also set up a joint venture with Airbus for the MRO of the Airbus A400M airlifter in service with RMAF.

In airline service, Boustead Heavy Industries's aviation division primarily comes from 51% owned MHS Aviation. It is Malaysia's largest civil helicopter operator, controlling 70% of the market share and is mostly involved in offshore oil and gas transport.

Defence related businesses

Electronics division 
Boustead Heavy Industries Corporation Bhd's electronics division started as an in-house repair and maintenance for the Royal Malaysian Navy fleet and has now evolved into an independent business centre which offers service to both government and private sectors. It is a one stop centre providing service, maintenance, repair and complete overhaul of naval and ground electronic equipments and systems, located at Lumut, Malaysia. It has been appointed as the Malaysian Service Centre for SAAB 9LV212 Weapon Control System and EADS/Hensoldt  and TRML-3D Surveillance Radar used by the Malaysian Armed Forces.

Weaponry division 
Boustead Heavy Industries weaponry division offers services like repair, refurbishment and upgrade of terrestrial and naval weapon systems. It is also capable of refurbishment of armoured vehicles and various types of weapon system including decoy systems, torpedo systems, missiles and installing firing systems. It also provides technical and management services to associate companies like Boustead Naval Shipyard.

Manufacturing division 
Boustead Heavy Industries's manufacturing capabilities come from its subsidiaries and joint ventures. The biggest manufacturing capability comes from Boustead Heavy Industries's subsidiary Contraves Advanced Devices. Contraves Advanced Devices is located in Malacca and Cyberjaya and consists of 250 skilled employees. The other manufacturers under Boustead Heavy Industries are Pyrotechnical Ordnance Malaysia, which operate a factory in Bentong and produce artillery propellant for the Malaysian Army as well as BYO Marine, which produces small boats for the region.

Products

SGPV Program 

In 2011, Boustead Naval Shipyard was awarded a RM9 billion (US$2.8 billion) contract for the construction of 6 Second Generation Patrol Vessels also known as Maharaja Lela-class frigate for the Royal Malaysian Navy. Boustead Heavy Industries will design the ship with DCNS acting as the design authority and build all 6 ships entirely in Lumut, Malaysia. This represented the largest contract for the company since formation. The contract for the ships included intellectual property rights and technology transfer. The shipyard will undergo a major upgrade to accommodate the construction of the ships.

At DSA 2014, the program manager Mr Anuar replied to an interview saying that "The program is progressing rather well, with some parts already in critical design review" and "We expect the first ship to be finished by 2017 or early 2018". He also commented that the ships are "full fledged frigates and in my opinion, will be a huge deterrent for the Royal Malaysian Navy."

Various subcontracts like the Thales CAPTAS-2 Towed array sonar, the Bofors 57 mm gun, torpedo launching systems have already been awarded and the first ship was expected to be completed in 2018. Delivery of the ships has since been delayed and the first ship is now expected to be commissioned in 2025.

NGPV Program 

PSC-Naval Dockyard, the company now absorbed by Boustead Heavy Industries Corporation Berhad, was made the major contractor for the building and delivery of the New Generation Patrol Vessels (NGPV) programme for the Royal Malaysian Navy.  An international tender for bids was announced, with Germany, Denmark, the Netherlands, the United States, Australia, United Kingdom and Italy amongst others submitting their bids. PSC-ND was set to joint venture with the winner to complete the program.

The German Naval Group (GNG) with their proposed model, based on the Blohm + Voss MEKO 100 design, won the bid. A contract was signed on 13 October 1998 for an initial six units, with the GNG as the major sub-contractor. A member of the GNG, the Hamburg-based Blohm + Voss was to build the first two ships, while PSC-ND was to complete the final fitting out and trials. The remaining ships were to be built at the PSC-Naval Dockyard from ship modules supplied by the GNG, with a gradual increase of local content.

Subsequent financial and delivery problems of PSC-Naval Dockyard caused by serious corruption caused the Malaysian government to engage Boustead Holdings Bhd to acquire PSC-Naval Dockyard and complete the program after a delay of 18 months. The class of ship will later be named Kedah-class.

Fast Troop Vessels

The class of fast troop vessels of the Royal Malaysian Navy with the length of 38 meters and displacing 117 tons.

Miscellaneous 
Other than military vessels, Boustead Heavy Industries also provide commercial vessel, luxury yacht and heavy steel structures and platforms for the oil and gas industry.

Notable contracts 
In 2011, Boustead Naval Shipyard was awarded a RM9 billion (US$2.8 billion) contract for the construction of 6 Second Generation Patrol Vessels, representing the biggest contract ever awarded to Boustead Heavy Industries.
In Dec 2011, an agreement between Contraves Advanced Devices Sdn Bhd and Rheinmetall Defence Electronics Gmbh was signed for the manufacture and supply of Cargo Loading System Assemblies for the Airbus A400M, Airbus A380, Airbus A330 aircraft during LIMA 2011.
In February 2012, Contraves Advanced Devices was awarded an initial contract by Raytheon Company for the production and supply of components for the Evolved Sea Sparrow Missile (ESSM). This is the first contract of its type awarded to a Malaysian company. Raytheon qualified Contraves Advanced Devices Sdn. Bhd. as a participant in the Strategic Enterprise Aligned Commodities provider program and as a Raytheon preferred supplier.
In March 2014, BHIC AeroServices was awarded a RM220 million contract for the maintenance and supply of spare parts for the Royal Malaysian Air Force's Eurocopter EC725 helicopters.
In March 2014, Boustead Penang Shipyard was awarded a RM108 million contract for the provision of engineering, procurement, construction and commissioning of offshore topsides for Block SK309 Belum Satellite-A Platform, in phase two of the Sarawak Gas Development Project
In September 2014, Boustead DCNS Naval Corp Sdn Bhd (BDNC), a 60:40 joint venture consisting BHIC Defence Technologies Sdn Bhd and French-based DCNS, received the formal contract to undertake in-service support (ISS) for two of Malaysia's Scorpène-class submarine  at RM1.31 billion collectively.

References

External links 
 

2005 establishments in Malaysia
Naval ships
Defense companies of Malaysia
Engineering companies of Malaysia
Shipbuilding companies
Shipbuilding companies of Malaysia
Malaysian companies established in 2005
Manufacturing companies established in 2005
Manufacturing companies based in Kuala Lumpur
Companies listed on Bursa Malaysia